Powell River may refer to:

Places
 Powell River (British Columbia), a river on the Sunshine Coast of British Columbia in Canada
 Powell River, British Columbia, a city in Canada
 Powell River Airport
 Powell River Regional District, a regional district in British Columbia, Canada
 Powell River School District, a school board on the Sunshine Coast in British Columbia, Canada
 Powell River (Tennessee River), a tributary of the Clinch River in the United States

Other uses
 Powell River Company (1908–1959), a forestry company that merged into what is now MacMillan Bloedel
 , a class of ferry operated by BC Ferries

See also

 
 Powell (disambiguation)
 River (disambiguation)